Simon Pallas (1694 – July 24, 1770) was a Prussian physician.

Pallas was born in Berlin, where he remained through his life. He was professor of surgery at the Collegium medico-chirurgicum, and first surgeon at the Charité hospital. He was considered a bold surgeon, and wrote a number of textbooks on the subject.

He was the father of famous zoologist and botanist Peter Simon Pallas, and of physician August Friedrich Pallas.

Writings
 Anleitung zur praktischen Chirurgie (Guide to Practical Surgery; 1763, 1770)
 Ueber die chirurgischen Operatione (On the Surgical Operations; 1763, 1770)
 Anleitung die Knochenkrankheiten zu heilen (Guide to Healing Bone Diseases; 1770)

References

 

1694 births
1770 deaths
German surgeons
Physicians of the Charité